Raheem Taylor-Parkes (born April 21, 1998) is a Canadian-American soccer player.

Career 
Taylor-Parkes signed to play with United Soccer League side Bethlehem Steel FC in 2016 on an amateur contract to allow him to still be eligible to play college soccer at the University of Virginia, whom he'd verbally agreed to join after graduating high school.

In August 2018, Taylor-Parkes reportedly signed a deal with Swiss amateur side, Stade-Lausanne-Ouchy in the Swiss Promotion League. However, he was unable to secure a work permit due to non-EU regulations.

On April 7, 2019, Taylor-Parkes scored the Lakeland Tropics' first-ever U.S. Open Cup goal.

He was named to the Canadian U15 national team for the 2013 Copa de México de Naciones.

References

External links 
 
 Tampa Bay United profile

1998 births
Living people
Canadian soccer players
Philadelphia Union II players
Association football forwards
Soccer players from Tampa, Florida
USL Championship players
Soccer players from Mississauga
USL League Two players
Virginia Cavaliers men's soccer players
Lakeland Tropics players
Expatriate footballers in Switzerland
Canadian expatriate sportspeople in Switzerland
Swiss Promotion League players